The 2001–02 LEN Champions League was the 39th edition of LEN's premier competition for men's water polo clubs. It ran from 24 October 2001 to 25 May 2002, and it was contested by 28 teams. The Final Four (semifinals, final, and third place game) took place on May 24 and May 25 in Budapest.

Preliminary round

Blue Group

Red Group

Final Four (Budapest)
Hajós Alfréd Nemzeti Sportuszoda, Budapest, Hungary

Final standings

See also
2001–02 LEN Cup Winners' Cup
2001–02 LEN Cup

References

External links 
2002 LEN Champions League - Results

LEN Champions League seasons
Champions League
2001 in water polo
2002 in water polo